Sheleena is a 2020 Sri Lankan Sinhala mystery thriller film co-directed by Poojitha Gunathilake and Chandana Edirisinghe and produced by director Poojitha himself for Sheleena Films. It stars Dineth de Silva, Amanda Silva and Anuj Ranasinghe in main roles along with Jeewan Kumaranatunga and Veena Jayakody made supportive roles.

The story, dialogues, screenplay, lyrics, melody and production done by Poojitha Gunathilaka. The media screening of the film was held at the Ruby Cinema Hall in Maradana in August 2020. The Tamil dubbed version of the film was released on Ruby theater, Maligawatte; Samantha theater, Dematagoda; Concord theater, Dehiwala; and the Jaffna MC.

Plot

The film revolves around three main Characters Sheleena, Prathap and Suraj.  Sheleena is a beautiful lass whose main interest is Dancing and engaged to a young Crime Investigation Officer Suraj.  A serial killer is in town and chain of murders occurs of ballerinas and CID is in the quest of searching the culprit.
Prathap is a person with a mysterious lifestyle and one day Sheleena is being kidnapped and kept under lock and key by him but kept as pet along with his other animal lovers.  Gradually a romance been developed among two and the end of the story turns into an unexpected end.

Cast
 Dineth de Silva as Prathap
 Amanda Silva as Sheleena
 Anuj Ranasinghe as Suraj
 Jeewan Kumaranatunga as Randeniya
 Veena Jayakody
 Manohari Wimalatunga
 Rohitha Dias
 Dushi Priyanga Illangakoon
 Rohan Wijetunga as Chandana
 Dayasiri Hettiarahchi
 Sanjula Diwarathne

References

External links
 
 ෂෙලීනා රිදි තිරයට ලගදිම
 Official facebook page
 ‘ෂෙලීනා’ නුදුරේදී රිදී තිරයේ. 'සිනමාව වැට්ටුවේ අපේම අය.’ ප‍්‍රවීණ කලා ශිල්පී පූජිත ගුණතිලක

2020s Sinhala-language films
2020 films
Sri Lankan thriller films
2020 thriller films